Robert Andrew Cook (June 7, 1912 – March 11, 1991) was the president of The King's College (New York) in Briarcliff Manor, and also a  Christian author, radio broadcaster, and pastor.

He went to Moody Bible Institute when he was 16 years old. After graduating, he went to Wheaton College (Illinois) and earned a B.A.  He then went to Eastern Baptist Theological Seminary, and was ordained a Baptist minister in 1931, serving 18 years as a full-time pastor.

Cook's most famous book, Now That I Believe, was originally published in 1949.  It went on to become translated in 27 languages and sold over one million copies.

In 1962, he became the second president of The King's College when it was in Briarcliff Manor.  He served in this position until 1985, and then became Chancellor of the college until his death.

From 1962 to 1964, Cook served as president of the National Association of Evangelicals.  Later, from 1985 to 1988, he was the president of the National Religious Broadcasters.

His daily radio program, The King's Hour, was broadcast for 29 years.  Now known as Walk with the King, it is currently aired on Family Radio and other stations. His most recognizable and famous lines from his radio broadcasts is where Dr. Cook opens with "Hello my radio friend...how in the world are you?" and his closing of "Until I meet you once again by way of radio, walk with the King today, and be a blessing!"  His radio program series is heard daily on Family Radio.

Personal life
He was born in Santa Clara, California, to Charles and Daisy Cook.  His mother died when he was about 16 months old.  His dad raised him and his sister, Mildred.

In 1935, Cook married Coreen Nilsen, and they had three daughters.

References

External links
 Walk with the King

1912 births
1991 deaths
20th-century evangelicals
American Christian writers
American evangelicals
American male non-fiction writers
American radio hosts
The King's College (New York City)
Palmer Theological Seminary alumni
People from Santa Clara, California
Wheaton College (Illinois) alumni